The Rascals were an English rock band formed in Hoylake, Merseyside in 2007. Their debut album Rascalize, was released on 23 June 2008. Its former lead singer Miles Kane has a second band, the Last Shadow Puppets, with Alex Turner of Arctic Monkeys. In August 2009, it was announced that Miles Kane had left the Rascals to focus on a solo career.

History

Early years
Hailing from Hoylake (The Wirral, on Merseyside) in England, the band began writing material as a three piece in September 2007. The Rascals were signed to Deltasonic Records and played their first gig supporting bands, including Arctic Monkeys.

Initial releases
They released their debut EP, Out of Dreams, on 9 December 2007, which contains their first single of the same name. Then, on 18 February 2008, they released their second single, Suspicious Wit.

Rascalize
The Rascals' debut album Rascalize was released on 23 June 2008 (first released on iTunes on 15 June 2008). Although it was not a commercial success, only peaking at #100 on the UK Albums Chart for one week, the album was generally well received by critics.

Appearance in Awaydays
The Rascals perform a cover version of All That Jazz, originally by Echo & The Bunnymen, in the film Awaydays, based on the book by Kevin Sampson. The track is available on the soundtrack which was released on 18 May 2008.

Miles Kane's departure
On 24 August 2009, lead singer Miles Kane confirmed to NME.COM that he had quit The Rascals. Kane stated that he was writing new material and had been in the studio. Greg Mighall and Joe Edwards announced they were working on a film project with 'Awaydays' star Liam Boyle.

Conflicts with the name
Despite carrying the same name as the American band The Rascals, the English band has stated that it was unintentionally copied. Miles Kane used to tell in several interviews that when they were in The Little Flames they were often called "You Little Rascals".

Membership
The group consisted of:
 Miles Kane – Lead vocals and guitar
 Joe Edwards – Bass
 Greg Mighall – Drums

Discography

Album

EPs

Singles

Music videos
 Out of Dreams
 Suspicious Wit
 Freakbeat Phantom
 I'll Give You Sympathy
 I'll Give You Sympathy (Night Time Version)

References

External links
 Profile at Last.fm

English indie rock groups
Musical groups established in 2007
Musical groups from Merseyside
Deltasonic Records artists